Lives of the Mayfair Witches is a trilogy of supernatural horror/fantasy novels by American novelist Anne Rice. It centers on a family of witches whose fortunes have been guided for generations by a spirit named Lasher. The series began in 1990 with The Witching Hour, which was followed by the sequels Lasher (1993) and Taltos (1994). All three novels debuted at No. 2 on The New York Times Best Seller list.

Some characters from the trilogy cross over to Rice's The Vampire Chronicles, a series of gothic horror novels featuring the vampire Lestat de Lioncourt, specifically in Merrick (2000), Blackwood Farm (2002), and Blood Canticle (2003).

A television series adaptation, Mayfair Witches, debuted on AMC and AMC+ in January 2023.

Overview
Susan Ferraro of The New York Times described The Witching Hour as "a ghost story about an evil spirit called Lasher who is so permeated with foreboding and evil that themes like abortion and incest are merely secondary. There is Christian symbolism straight and skewed, rough sex and necrophilia." Publishers Weekly wrote that "Rice plumbs a rich vein of witchcraft lore, conjuring ... the decayed antebellum mansion where incest rules, dolls are made of human bone and hair, and violent storms sweep the skies each time a witch dies and the power passes on." The publication called Lasher "another vast, transcontinental saga of witchcraft and demonism in the tradition of Gothic melodrama." The Mary Sue described the series as "half narrative, half exposition of the entire family tree". The website also noted the "overuse of incest" and casual treatment of horror and violence, which "permeates the Gothic atmosphere." Publishers Weekly wrote that "cutting-edge gene mapping intertwines with ancient mysteries" in Taltos. Alexander Theroux of the Chicago Tribune called Taltos "a dark and intimidating mystery" and wrote that Rice "continues the dark epic of the Mayfair witches, her saga of the occult ... that takes us on temporal and spatial journeys back through the centuries, probing plots of corruption and innocence, mortality and immortality, good and evil. The genre goes back to the Gothic novels of Ann Radcliffe and Horace Walpole, the kind of books, with their creaking armor, salivating monks and thunderstorms, satirized by Thomas Love Peacock in his Crotchet Castle."

Characters
Upon the death of her estranged biological mother Deirdre, California neurosurgeon Rowan Mayfair is shocked to find herself named the new designee of the Mayfair family fortune. Rowan revives drowned contractor Michael Curry, who finds that the near-death experience grants him unwanted extrasensory powers.

Michael is also one of very few people who has seen the mysterious Lasher, a ghost who haunts the Mayfairs. Lasher is described as "a slim, pale, elegant figure with dark eyes and dark hair and a hypnotically seductive power over any [of the Mayfairs] reckless enough to entertain him." Lasher, whom Publishers Weekly describes as "devil, seducer, spirit", is a demon linked to the Mayfairs for generations. Summoned by Scottish witch Suzanne Mayfair in the 1600s, Lasher "goes on to bedevil her descendants down to the present day, seeing in them the means of fulfilling his ghastly and unnatural ambitions." Under Lasher's influence, the Mayfairs become an enormously wealthy family of witches, able to "attract and manipulate unseen forces." The demon seduces each new designee and orchestrates incestuous unions among the family, with ulterior motives. Rowan is the 13th such Mayfair designee, who Lasher believes will give him his chance to rejoin the living. Publishers Weekly called Lasher "both child and man at the same time", and Patrick McGrath suggested that Lasher is actually the protagonist of The Witching Hour.

Lasher's plan comes to fruition at the end of The Witching Hour when he invades Rowan's unborn fetus and is reborn. The baby is genetically a non-human, ancient species called the Taltos, which is "the superhuman result of the crossbreeding of two human witches who possess an extra chromosome". The infant Lasher immediately grows to adulthood, and Publishers Weekly describes the creature as "almost a monster ... capable of beastly behavior fueled by an extraordinary sex drive." He rapes Rowan repeatedly in Lasher to create more Taltos, but the attempts end in violent miscarriages. Rowan finally conceives and gives birth to a Taltos daughter, Emaleth, but ultimately kills her. Michael fathers another Taltos with Rowan's cousin Mona Mayfair, a daughter she names Morrigan, in Taltos.

Theroux wrote, "The Mayfair witches are easily the largest dysfunctional family on earth, and yet, perhaps not surprisingly, face the same soap-opera problems of any other extended family—jealousy, sex, drink, rape, revenge, inexplicable pregnancy, sudden death, crazed children and occasional murder." Of the extended Mayfair family, McGrath noted, "Mayfairs often come to bad ends, generally either burning to death or falling from high places, and we meet many members of many generations of them". Notable Mayfairs include: Julien, "the genial dandy who can be in two places at once and start fires with his mind" and who "movingly recalls his male lovers"; Stella, "the flapper, wildly dancing the Charleston, the witch who just wants to have fun"; her granddaughter Deirdre, "whose sexual passion for Lasher is so intense that terrible old Aunt Carlotta keeps her doped to the eyeballs on Thorazine all her adult life"; and Mona, the "young feminist witch with sharklike business instincts" who has also been described as Rowan's "13-year-old sexpot niece ... who is herself the most powerful witch of the Mayfair clan." Red haired, green eyed Mona is the "ascendant character" of Taltos. The novel also introduces Ashlar, an ancient Taltos living in New York, whom Theroux described as a "mild seven-foot mysterioso who ... fears flying, has no soul and has a white streak of hair coming from his left temple, [and] has a brain twice the size of that of a human." Having not seen another of his kind in centuries, Ashlar is "driven essentially to the job of revealing the riddle of not only who and what he is but what he wants."

Works

The Witching Hour (1990)

The Witching Hour is the first novel in Rice's Lives of the Mayfair Witches trilogy. It was published by Knopf in 1990. The Mayfairs' First Street house is based on Rice's own antebellum mansion in New Orleans, with fictional events written as if taking place in specific locations in the real-world house. Rice bought the mansion with the advance for The Witching Hour. She called The Witching Hour "a Gothic epic", and said, "The Turn of the Screw is a wonderful haunting novel [but it is] just the beginning. I want The Witching Hour to be as great or greater than Henry James."

Plot
Dr. Rowan Mayfair is a gifted neurosurgeon in San Francisco, California. When her estranged birth mother Deirdre Mayfair dies in New Orleans, she begins to learn about the old Southern family to which she belongs. Michael Curry is a contractor who specializes in the restoration of old homes while dreaming of his childhood in New Orleans and yearning to return there. Rowan gradually realizes that she has the psychic power to either save or take lives. Michael drowns but she revives him, the near-death experience triggering a new and unwanted clairvoyant ability within him. Michael and Rowan fall in love, and when he decides to return to New Orleans, she follows him to learn the secrets of her past.

Aaron Lightner, a psychic scholar and member of the Talamasca, has studied the Mayfairs from afar for decades. The matriarchal family—known to the Talamasca as the "Mayfair Witches"—have a long and sordid history. Among the supernatural events surrounding them is a mysterious man, seen by Michael in his childhood and by other members of the family over time. Michael is revealed to be a Mayfair cousin, he and Rowan sharing lines of descent from the male witch Julien Mayfair. Rowan and Michael marry and conceive a child. As the designee of the Mayfair legacy, Rowan assumes control of the family's affairs. Soon the mysterious man reveals himself to her: he is Lasher, a spirit with wicked motives who has plagued the Mayfairs for centuries. His wish is to be made flesh so that he may walk the earth again in the permanent physical form of a human being, and he sets about slowly seducing Rowan.

Secretly thinking that she can outwit Lasher, Rowan sends Michael away from the house on Christmas Eve. Her plan is to bind Lasher to "weak matter" which she can destroy with her mental killing power, but this backfires. Lasher enters her womb and makes himself at home in the fetus. Rowan immediately goes into labor, which is violent and bloody, and Lasher enters the world as a human infant. But the hybrid baby immediately grows into a full-sized, intelligent man. Michael returns and tries to kill the creature, but Lasher is too strong and nearly drowns Michael in the pool. During this second near-death experience, Michael ends up losing the unwanted psychic sensitivity in his hands. Fearing for Michael's life, Rowan flees to Europe with Lasher.

Reception
The Witching Hour debuted at No. 2 on The New York Times Best Seller list, and remained in that position for four weeks, spending a total of 22 weeks on the list. Writing for The New York Times, Patrick McGrath found Lasher's origins "intriguing", and described the many characters in the extended Mayfair family as "all vividly sketched, all gloriously weird." He noted the novel's "tireless narrative energy" and "relentless inventiveness", but also called it "bloated" with repetitive storytelling. McGrath also criticized the characterization of central human characters Rowan and Michael, writing that "they have both been so constructed that they hardly for a moment live or breathe except as structural elements serving specific design functions in the grand scheme." According to Publishers Weekly, "This massive tome repeatedly slows, then speeds when Rice casts off the Talamasca's pretentious, scholarly tones and goes for the jugular with morbid delights, sexually charged passages and wicked, wild tragedy." Susan Ferraro of The New York Times called the novel "unquestionably absorbing" but noted, "At the end, it seems to stumble ... because the fiercely protective Michael does something completely out of character to make way for the denouement; ultimately what creaks loudest is not the haunted house but the plot."

Lasher (1993)

Lasher by is the second novel in Rice's Lives of the Mayfair Witches trilogy. It was published by Knopf in 1993.

Plot
Rowan has disappeared and Michael, feeling betrayed by her, has sunk into a depression, helped along by the useless drugs prescribed to him after his near-drowning. The sexually adventurous Mona Mayfair, a precocious teenage cousin also descended from Julien, is a powerful witch. She seduces Michael, who snaps out of his stupor and commits himself to finding Rowan, who he is now convinced did not leave willingly. Rowan, meanwhile, is essentially Lasher's prisoner. His first two attempts at impregnating her are failures ending in miscarriage, but he is successful the third time. Traveling with Lasher throughout Europe, Rowan manages to send DNA samples to colleagues in San Francisco. They discover that Lasher is a completely different species, later identified as a Taltos. Rowan herself has a genetic abnormality, polyploidy, or 92 chromosomes, which is probably what made Lasher's quasi-supernatural birth at all possible in the first place.

In the past, Julien finds himself to be the only known male Mayfair witch, and learns how to manipulate the spirit Lasher. Julien impregnates numerous Mayfair women as part of Lasher's scheme of inbreeding, which Julien believes is a means to keep power in the family but is actually the way by which Lasher hopes to resurrect himself in flesh. Rowan returns to America with Lasher, who sets out to impregnate other female members of the Mayfair family. All attempts are unsuccessful as the women immediately miscarry and hemorrhage to death. Rowan manages to escape Lasher, and after hitchhiking to Louisiana, she collapses in a field and gives birth to Emaleth, a female Taltos. Rowan's last words to Emaleth are to find Michael, which she sets out to do, thinking that Rowan has died. Rowan is found and is rushed to a nearby hospital in a state of toxic shock. An emergency hysterectomy is performed to save her life, eliminating any chance of her ever giving birth again. She is taken home to Michael, where she remains in a deep coma.

Lasher tells Michael and Aaron his story of his past life. Born to Anne Boleyn, the second wife of Henry VIII of England, and a man from Donnelaith, Scotland, Lasher is believed to be a saint known as Ashlar. He is quickly taken away by his father, who is the son of the Earl of Donnelaith, and from there he is sent to Italy to become a priest. Lasher returns to Scotland after Elizabeth I takes the throne, and is killed there while performing Christmas Mass by followers of the Protestant reformer John Knox. His next memory is the summoning of his spirit by the witch Suzanne Mayfair in Donnelaith. When Lasher's story is complete, Michael kills him and buries him under the great oak in the yard. Michael discovers Emaleth in Rowan's room, feeding her mother the highly nutritious milk from her breasts. Rowan is revived, but upon seeing Emaleth before her, panics and screams at Michael to kill her. Michael refuses to, so Rowan grabs a gun and shoots her daughter in the head. Rowan immediately realizes what she has done, and crying for her daughter, insists that she be the one to bury her alongside Lasher.

Reception
Lasher debuted at No. 2 on The New York Times Best Seller list, and remained in that position for three weeks, spending a total of 17 weeks on the list. Publishers Weekly noted of the novel, "Long sections ramble without a compelling point of view, and are dampened by stock elements: clichéd wind storms, sexy witches, the endless supply of money the Talamasca has at its disposal. At times, Lasher is too much in evidence (rattling the china, gnashing his teeth) to be frightening. But embedded in this antique demonism is a contemporary tale of incest and family abuse that achieves resonance." The publication added that "Rice's characters rise above the more wooden plot machinations with an ironic and modern complexity", and that "the novel is compelling through its exhaustive monumentality.

Taltos (1994)

Taltos is the third novel in Rice's Lives of the Mayfair Witches trilogy. It was published by Knopf in 1994.

Plot
Ashlar, the founder of a multi-million dollar toy corporation based in New York City, believes himself to be the last living Taltos. He is shocked to learn from his friend Samuel that a male Taltos has been seen in the glen of Donnelaith. Having buried Emaleth, Rowan exists in a semi-catatonic state. She walks, she bathes, she eats, but she does not speak and does not respond to those around her. Rowan is awakened by the news that Aaron, now excommunicated from the Talamasca and recently married into the Mayfair family, has been deliberately run over by a car. She makes plans with Michael to seek revenge on the Talamasca, who she believes are responsible for Aaron's death. Mona discovers that she is pregnant by Michael and, after Rowan gives her blessing, ecstatically shares the news with the family. Mona later discovers that her unborn child is a Taltos, a female she names Morrigan. She runs off with Mayfair cousin Mary Jane to Fontevrault, an old plantation sunken into the marsh that has been owned by a separate branch of the Mayfair family for generations. Mary Jane's grandmother, Dolly Jean, helps deliver the new Taltos. Mona names Morrigan the designee of the Mayfair legacy, and she and Mary Jane make plans for the future in case Rowan and Michael try to kill Morrigan.

In London, Michael and Rowan meet up with Yuri Stefano, a pupil and friend of Aaron who has also been excommunicated by the Talamasca. Through Yuri they meet the other Ashlar and his friend Samuel, who is one of the Little People of Donnelaith, dwarf-like Taltos who never fed on their mother's milk and were subsequently stunted. Ashlar kills Anton Marcus, the Superior General of the Talamasca, for his part in Aaron's death. Another Talamasca Scholar, Stuart Gordon, has been plotting with his pupils Marklin and Tommy to unite Ashlar with a female Taltos he has acquired. The excommunications of Aaron and Yuri, as well as Aaron's death, were a ruse perpetrated by Stuart to keep the men from interfering with his plans. Ashlar meets the female Taltos, Tessa, and disappoints Stuart with the news that Tessa is too advanced in age to bear children. Rowan uses her strong telepathic abilities to cause Stuart to have a fatal stroke. Yuri takes Tessa to the Talamasca, who welcome Tessa with open arms and punish Marklin and Tommy by burying them alive.

In New York, Ashlar tells Rowan and Michael the story of his long life. He explains that the Taltos once thrived peacefully on a tropical island north of the British Isles, where they had been since "The Time Before the Moon". The island's semi-active volcano reawakens, forcing the Taltos to flee south to the bitter cold of Scotland. They become hunter-gatherers, and occasionally see early humans, whom they sometimes keep as pets. The Taltos break off into different tribes and the largest of them, led by Ashlar, goes south to Somerset where they settle. Their peace is often disrupted by Celtic raids on the land. To adapt and live peacefully among humans, the Taltos become the Picts, and Ashlar their king. When Christianity comes to them in the form of St Columba, Ashlar converts with more than half his tribe. But there is a conflict between the Christians and non-Christians, and war ensues. Soon only five Taltos males are left, and they all become priests, including Ashlar. Several years later, he attempts to tell his story to a fellow priest, who believes the story is blasphemy. Ashlar is disillusioned, and goes on a pilgrimage, leaving Donnelaith forever.

Rowan and Michael return to New Orleans, where Michael is introduced to his daughter, Morrigan. He and Rowan accept Mona's decision to make Morrigan the designee. A frenzied Morrigan smells Ashlar on the gifts he has sent, just as he comes to the First Street house to visit. Morrigan rushes into his arms, and they run away together.

Reception
Taltos debuted at No. 2 on The New York Times Best Seller list, and remained in that position for five weeks, spending a total of 16 weeks on the list. Publishers Weekly wrote, "Pulsing with a persistent sense of foreboding, the novel is soggy with meandering, atmospheric prose that verges on softcore porn." Alexander Theroux of the Chicago Tribune wrote, "because this is a novel that is empty of style and color, it is turgid with story. It is a cat's cradle of unrealized characters, 25 or so stick figures who say things and disappear and not only are never vivid but also are never described."

Crossovers

Some Mayfair Witches characters cross over to Rice's The Vampire Chronicles, specifically in the novels Merrick (2000), Blackwood Farm (2002), and Blood Canticle (2003). The Vampire Chronicles is a series of gothic horror novels featuring the vampire Lestat de Lioncourt. In the crossover novels, former Talamasca leader David Talbot seeks out Merrick Mayfair, an octoroon descendant of Julien Mayfair, on behalf of the vampire Louis de Pointe du Lac. Mona and Rowan Mayfair are later brought into the narrative.

Merrick (2000)

With the help of former Talamasca leader-turned-vampire David Talbot, Louis de Pointe du Lac asks the beautiful witch Merrick Mayfair to use her spiritual powers to contact the spirit of Claudia, a child who, like Louis, had been turned into a vampire by Lestat but was destroyed long ago. Merrick is also a former agent of the Talamasca, and shared many adventures with David in the past. Flashbacks introduce Merrick's malevolent sister, Honey Isabella or Honey in the Sunshine; Merrick's mother, Cold Sandra; and the Great Nananne, a powerful witch whose very presence is enough to frighten and instill respect in David. Merrick and David recall their journey to a cave in Central America which contained malevolent spirit protecting an ancient jade mask, which allows people to see spirits as if they were corporeal. Merrick retrieves Claudia's diary from the Talamasca vaults, and makes it possible for Louis to speak with Claudia. After being made a vampire, Merrick reveals that from the beginning, she used her magic to lure David and Louis to her in hopes of receiving the Dark Gift of vampirism.

The novel introduces Merrick Mayfair, a powerful witch who is a cousin of the Mayfairs in the Mayfair Witches series.

Published on October 17, 2000, Merrick debuted at No. 2 on The New York Times Best Seller list.

Blackwood Farm (2002)

Tarquin "Quinn" Blackwood, heir to a powerful old family in New Orleans, asks for Lestat's help to get rid of Goblin, an increasingly malevolent spirit who has plagued Quinn for his entire life. Quinn recalls his youth, his family, and his forced transformation into a vampire by Petronia. His stories allow Lestat to better understand the reach and power of Goblin, and clue in Lestat to the fact that Quinn is connected to the Mayfair family of witches. After his own failure defeating Goblin, Lestat asks Merrick for assistance. Meanwhile, Quinn has fallen in love with heiress Mona Mayfair, and the ghost of their mutual ancestor Julien Mayfair warns him against making Mona a vampire. Goblin is revealed to be the spirit of Quinn's twin Gawain, who died days after being born. He is bound to Quinn, and is relentlessly jealous to experience whatever Quinn does. Merrick performs a ritual using Gawain's corpse to exorcise Goblin. She sacrifices herself by carrying the child's spirit into the hereafter with her, and Lestat is heartbroken.

The novel brings Mayfair Witches character Mona Mayfair into The Vampire Chronicles.

Published on October 29, 2002, Blackwood Farm debuted at No. 4 on The New York Times Best Seller list.

Blood Canticle (2003)

Mona is slowly dying, afflicted with a mysterious disease brought on by the birth of Morrigan. Over time, Mona and Rowan reveal more and more about the powerful genetic plague that has haunted the Mayfairs for generations: their connection to the Taltos, an advanced species of human to which both women have given birth. Lestat turns a dying Mona into a vampire so that she and Quinn can be together forever. While trying to prevent Mona's family from discovering her transformation, Lestat falls in love with the married Rowan, and she secretly pines for him as well. Mona adjusts to her new power. Lestat, Quinn and Mona arrive at the remote island colony of the Taltos, but instead of finding a secluded utopia, they discover that years of criminal intrigue and civil war have taken their toll. The remaining Taltos join the Mayfair clan in New Orleans. Mona and Quinn are instructed in the proper ways of vampirism by the ancient vampire Maharet and her twin Mekare. Rowan seeks out Lestat, half in love with him but torn by her love for her husband Michael. Exhausted by her life, she requests that he make her a vampire. Lestat declines, pained though he is, because she is a guiding force for the Mayfair family and he cannot take her away from it.

Rowan and Mona are major characters in the novel, and Publishers Weekly called Blood Canticle "the complete unification of the Mayfair witch saga with that of the Vampire Chronicles". The publication added that "the vampirization of young Mona, a true child of our times, gives Rice a dynamic new vampire personality with whom to play."

Published on October 28, 2003, Blood Canticle debuted at No. 5 on The New York Times Best Seller list.

Adaptations

Audiobooks
Random House Audio originally released abridged audiobook adaptations of all three Mayfair Witches novels on audio cassette, with narrators Lindsay Crouse (The Witching Hour), Joe Morton (Lasher), and Tim Curry (Taltos). They were re-released as a three-book "Value Collection" on CD in 2005, and digitally in 2013. In 2015, new unabridged audiobook adaptations were released digitally by Random House Audio for all three novels in the trilogy, performed by Kate Reading.

Television

Development rights to The Lives of the Mayfair Witches were still held by Warner Bros in December 2019, when Rice began shopping a package combining film and TV rights to both The Vampire Chronicles and Mayfair Witches. Rice was reportedly asking around $30 to $40 million, plus a $2.5 million buyout of Warner Bros.' rights, and the new owner would hold the rights in perpetuity, not just as an option. In May 2020, it was announced that AMC had acquired the rights to The Vampire Chronicles and Lives of the Mayfair Witches for developing film and television projects. Anne and Christopher Rice will serve as executive producers on any projects developed. Rice said, "It's always been my dream to see the worlds of my two biggest series united under a single roof so that filmmakers could explore the expansive and interconnected universe of my vampires and witches. That dream is now a reality, and the result is one of the most significant and thrilling deals of my long career."

In December 2021, Deadline Hollywood reported that Anne Rice's Mayfair Witches had been given an eight-episode series order by AMC, with another Rice series, Interview with the Vampire, already in production at the network. Mayfair Witches will be written and executive produced by Esta Spalding and Michelle Ashford, and executive produced by Mark Johnson. The series stars Alexandra Daddario as Rowan Mayfair, Harry Hamlin as Cortland Mayfair, Tongayi Chirisa as Ciprien Grieve, and Jack Huston as Lasher. Recurring roles include Annabeth Gish as Deirdre Mayfair, Beth Grant as Carlotta Mayfair, Erica Gimpel as Ellie Mayfair and Jen Richards as Jojo. The series will debut on AMC and AMC+ on January 8, 2023.

References

External links
 
 Mayfair Witches at AnneRice.com
 Anne Rice's Mayfair Family Tree – Part 1
  Anne Rice's Mayfair Family Tree – Part 2
  Anne Rice's Vampire Tree
 

American horror novels
American novels adapted into television shows
Alfred A. Knopf books
Book series introduced in 1990
Fantasy novel trilogies
Horror novel series
Incest in fiction
Novels by Anne Rice
Picts in fiction
Witchcraft in written fiction
Novels set in New Orleans